Anthem Lights is the debut album by the American Christian pop band Anthem Lights. The album was released on May 10, 2011, on Reunion Records and contains all three tracks from their self-titled EP, which was released on February 1, 2011.

Critical reception

Anthem Lights received a majority of mixed reviews, but overall positive reception in the aggregate by music critics. At CCM Magazine, Andy Argyrakis rated the album three stars, writing "Anthem Lights explodes with youthful exuberance, alongside a lyrical depth about living a life with a purpose that can simultaneously connect with peers and their parents." William Ruhlmann of Allmusic rated the album three stars, stating "Anthem Lights may not be original, but they are a bunch of cute young guys, and that can be as important in CCM as in pop music generally." At Christianity Today, Robert Ham rated the album two stars, saying "it doesn't make any effort to differentiate itself from every other faith-based rock band on the radio these days." Jamie Maxwell of Cross Rhythms rated the album six-out-of-ten, writing that "in common with the majority of pop music, no new lyrical depth is explored here." At Christian Broadcasting Network, Jae Rae rated the album three spins, stating that "If this promising debut is any indication, Anthem Lights' refreshing sound will benefit Christian music for many years come." Jerold Wallace of Jesus Freak Hideout rated the album two-and-a-half stars, saying that the release is "modest" that they are "sticking to the safe, pop/praise formula." At Jesus Freak Hideout, Kevin Hoskins rated the album three stars, writing that "half of Anthem Lights is pretty good while the other half is pretty weak. It's not a bad start for a band that can have a decent future if they can work out some of the kinks." Haydon Spenceley of The Phantom Tollbooth rated the album three tocks, saying "Anthem Lights is a good album." At New Release Tuesday, Sarah Fine rated the album four stars, stating that it is "one of the strongest debut albums". Jono Davies of Louder Than the Music rated the album four-and-a-half stars, and according to him "what stands out more than anything on this album is how much these songs have good hooks that make them stick in your head long after you have had a listen." At Alpha Omega News, Tom Frigoli graded the album an A+, saying that "the album is an excellent testament to the band’s creativity and talent."

Track listing

Personnel 
 Chad Graham - vocals
 Caleb Grimm - vocals
 Alan Powell - vocals
 Joseph "Joey" Stamper - vocals

References 

2011 debut albums
Anthem Lights albums